
Year 105 BC was a year of the pre-Julian Roman calendar. At the time it was known as the Year of the Consulship of Rufus and Maximus (or, less frequently, year 649 Ab urbe condita) and the Sixth Year of Yuanfeng. The denomination 105 BC for this year has been used since the early medieval period, when the Anno Domini calendar era became the prevalent method in Europe for naming years.

Events 
 By place 
 Roman Republic 
 January 1 – Gnaeus Mallius Maximus and Publius Rutilius Rufus become Roman consuls. 
 October 6 – The Battle of Arausio, where the Cimbri destroy two Roman armies on the Rhône, is the most severe defeat of Roman forces since the Battle of Cannae.
 Gaius Marius, together with the consul Publius Rutilius Rufus, initiates sweeping reforms of the Roman army.
 Lucius Cornelius Sulla secures the capture of Jugurtha. His success is made possible by the treachery of Bocchus I, king of Mauretania, and this ends the Jugurthine War (which began in 112 BC).
 At Rome, the first official gladiator match is demonstrated by gladiators from Capua, as part of a training program for the military.

 Asia 
 The Han Dynasty forms an alliance with the Wusun by marrying a Han princess to their king.
 Wuwei Chanyu of the Xiongnu dies and is succeeded by his youthful son Er Chanyu. That winter heavy snowstorms lead to the deaths of many livestock, and there is discontent with the new ruler, who is regarded as belligerent.

Births 
 Decimus Laberius, Roman nobleman and Latin writer (d. 43 BC)
 Tiberius Claudius Nero, Roman politician and general 
 Marcus Atius Balbus, Roman praetor and governor (d. 51 BC)

Deaths 
 Marcus Aurelius Scaurus, Roman politician and general, executed as a prisoner of war in the advent of the Battle of Arausio

References